Jeffersonville Township is one of twelve townships in Clark County, Indiana. As of the 2010 census, its population was 59,062 and it contained 27,023 housing units.

History
Jeffersonville Township was organized in 1817.

Government
Jeffersonville Township is governed by the Jeffersonville Township Trustee's office. The current Jeffersonville Trustee is Dale Popp. The Trustee works with a three-person Trustee Advisory Board that consist of Phil Ellis, Brandy Brewer, and Shirley Bell.

Geography
Brick House Pond and Silver Lakes are in this township.

Cities and towns
 Clarksville (east three-quarters)
 Jeffersonville (west three-quarters)
 Oak Park (west three-quarters)

Unincorporated towns
 Arctic Springs
 Blackiston Village
 Cementville
 Port Fulton
(This list is based on USGS data and may include former settlements.)

Adjacent townships
 Silver Creek Township (north)
 Utica Township (northeast)
 New Albany Township, Floyd County (west)

Major highways
  Interstate 65
  Interstate 265
  U.S. Route 31
  State Road 3
  State Road 60
  State Road 131

Cemeteries
The township contains several cemeteries: Applegate, Civil War, Eastern (aka Chestnut Grove Cemetery), Espy, Gilmore, Grayson, Hale McBride Family, Lacassagne/Moore, McBride, McClintick, Old City, Mulberry Street and Chestnut/Market Street, St. Anthony's, Stewart, and Walnut Ridge.

References
 
 United States Census Bureau cartographic boundary files

External links

 Indiana Township Association
 United Township Association of Indiana

Townships in Clark County, Indiana
Clarksville, Indiana
Jeffersonville, Indiana

Townships in Indiana